The 1460 class was a class of diesel locomotives built by Clyde Engineering, Eagle Farm for Queensland Railways between 1964 and 1966.

History

The 1460 class was an evolution of the 1450 class fitted with a new carbody and cab as well as dual controls and improved generators. Five were fitted with dynamic braking for descending the Haughton Range from Charters Towers to Townsville on the Great Northern Railway (Mt Isa line). They operated services along the North Coast line.

The first was withdrawn in December 1986. In 1995, 21 were sold to Tranz Rail in New Zealand. 1492 being the first withdrawn, only after a level crossing accident in Townsville. Eighteen were overhauled at Hutt Workshops and placed in service with Tranz Rail as the DQ and QR classes or with the Australian Transport Network in Tasmania as the DQ2000 class. Four Tranz Rail DQs were exported to South Africa in 2013.

1461 has been preserved by Queensland Rail's Heritage Division and stored at Workshops Rail Museum, North Ipswich.

Class register

See also 
 New Zealand DQ and QR class locomotives

References

Clyde Engineering locomotives
Co-Co locomotives
Diesel locomotives of Tasmania
Queensland Rail locomotives
Railway locomotives introduced in 1964
3 ft 6 in gauge locomotives of Australia
Diesel-electric locomotives of Australia